The 15th Maine Infantry Regiment was an infantry regiment that served in the Union Army during the American Civil War.

Service
The 15th Maine Infantry was organized in Augusta, Maine December 6–31, 1861 and mustered in January 23, 1862, for a three-year enlistment.

The regiment was attached to Butler's New Orleans Expeditionary Corps January to March 1862. 3rd Brigade, Department of the Gulf, to September 1862, District of West Florida, Department of the Gulf, to June 1863. 2nd Brigade, 4th Division, XIX Corps, Department of the Gulf, to December 1863. 3rd Brigade, 2nd Division, XIII Corps, Department of the Gulf, to January 1864. 2nd Brigade, 4th Division, XIII Corps, Department of the Gulf, to February 1864. 2nd Brigade, 1st Division, XIX Corps, Department of the Gulf, to July 1864, and Army of the Shenandoah, Middle Military Division, to April 1865. 1st Brigade, 1st Division, Department of Washington, to June 1865. 2nd Separate Brigade, District of South Carolina, Department of the South, to July 1866.

The 15th Maine Infantry mustered out of service July 5, 1866.

Detailed service
Moved to Portland February 25, and there embarked for Ship Island, Miss., March 6. Duty at Ship Island, Miss., until May 1862, and at Camp Parapet and Carrollton May 19-September 8. Moved to Pensacola, Fla., September 8, and duty there until June 1863. Action at Fifteen Mile House, Fla., February 25, 1863, and at Arcadia March 6. Ordered to New Orleans June 21, then to La Fourche Landing. Expedition to Thibodeaux June 23–25. At Camp Parapet until August, and provost duty in New Orleans until October. Expedition to the Rio Grande, Texas, October 27-December 2. Advance on Brownsville November 3–6. Occupation of Brownsville November 6. Expedition to Aransas November 14–21. Aransas Pass and capture of Mustang Island November 17. Fort Esperanza November 25–27. Cedar Bayou November 23 (detachment). Duty at Pass Cavallo  Matagorda Island, until February 28, 1864. Moved to Franklin, La., March 1–5. Red River Campaign March 10-May 22. Advance from Franklin to Alexandria March 14–26, then to Natchitoches March 26-April 2. Battle of Sabine Cross Roads April 8. Pleasant Hill April 9. Cane River Crossing April 23. At Alexandria April 26-May 13. Retreat to Morganza May 13–22. Mansura May 16. Duty at Morganza until July. Moved to Fort Monroe, then to Bermuda Hundred, Va., July 1–17 (6 companies). Duty in trenches at Bermuda Hundred until July 28. Deep Bottom July 28–30. Moved to Washington, D.C., then to Monocacy, Md. (4 companies, under Murray and Drew, moved from Morganza to Washington, D.C., July 1–12. Pursuit of Early July 14–24. Rejoin regiment at Monocacy, Md., August 4.) Veterans on furlough August 5-October l. Non-veterans temporarily attached to 13th Maine Infantry, and duty at Harpers Ferry until October 5. Regiment moved to Martinsburg October 5, and duty there until January 7, 1865. Moved to Stevenson's Depot, and operations in the Shenandoah Valley until April. Moved to Washington, D.C., April 19–23, and duty there until May 31. On provost duty during the Grand Review of the Armies May 23–24. Moved to Savannah, Ga., May 31-June 4, then to Georgetown, S.C., June 13–14. Duty at Georgetown, Darlington, Cheraw, Chesterfield C. H., Bennettsville, Columbia and in Districts of Chester, Lancaster, York, Spartanburg and Union until July 1866.

Casualties
The regiment lost a total of 348 men during service; 5 enlisted men killed or mortally wounded, 3 officers and 340 enlisted men died of disease.

Commanders
 Colonel Isaac Dyer

See also

 List of Maine Civil War units
 Maine in the American Civil War

References
 Dyer, Frederick H.  A Compendium of the War of the Rebellion (Des Moines, IA:  Dyer Pub. Co.), 1908.
 Shorey, Henry Augustus.  The Story of the Maine Fifteenth (Bridgton, ME:  Press of the Bridgton News), 1890.  [reprinted in 2009, ]
Attribution
 

Military units and formations established in 1861
Military units and formations disestablished in 1866
15th Maine Volunteer Infantry Regiment